Batman: Mask of the Phantasm (also known as Batman: The Animated Movie - Mask of the Phantasm) is a 1993 American animated romantic superhero film featuring the DC Comics character Batman. It was directed by Eric Radomski and Bruce Timm, and written by Alan Burnett, Paul Dini, Martin Pasko, and Michael Reaves. The film is based on Batman: The Animated Series (1992-1995) and is the first original theatrical film produced by Warner Bros. Animation, the first film in the DC Animated Universe and the only one released theatrically. Kevin Conroy, Mark Hamill, Efrem Zimbalist Jr., Bob Hastings and Robert Costanzo reprise their voice roles from Batman: The Animated Series, joined by Dana Delany, Hart Bochner, Stacy Keach Jr., Abe Vigoda, Dick Miller and John P. Ryan. Produced between the first and second seasons of the series, the film follows Batman as he reconciles with a former lover, Andrea Beaumont, and faces a mysterious vigilante who is murdering Gotham City's crime bosses. The plot was inspired by Mike W. Barr's Batman: Year Two comic book story arc, but features an original antagonist, the Phantasm, in place of the Reaper, while also borrowing elements from the Batman: Year One graphic novel, recounting how Bruce Wayne became Batman and his first attempts to fight crime.

Originally planned for a direct-to-video release, Warner Bros. gave Mask of the Phantasm a theatrical release, condensing its production into a strenuous eight-month schedule. The film was the first theatrical feature film produced by Warner Bros. Animation, and was released through the studio's Family Entertainment division on December 25, 1993, to positive reviews from critics, who praised the stylized animation, voice performances, story, and music. In the years since its release, Mask of the Phantasm has developed a cult following, and continued to receive acclaim. In 2011, Time ranked it as one of the 10 best superhero films ever. In 2017, Screen Rant named the film the best Batman movie of all time. In 2018, Paste magazine called the film "the greatest Batman movie". In 2022, Empire magazine named it the best Batman film. Also in 2022, Rolling Stone placed Mask of the Phantasm at number 19 on its list of the 50 Greatest Superhero Movies of All Time, being the only traditionally-animated film included, the third-best animated superhero film and the second-best Batman film of all time, behind only The Dark Knight (number eight).

Due to the decision to release it in theaters on short notice, Mask of the Phantasm failed at the box office. After its release on home media, it became financially successful. Its success led to other animated Batman movies, though direct-to-video releases, such as Batman & Mr. Freeze: SubZero (1998). Until the limited release of Batman: The Killing Joke in 2016, Mask of the Phantasm was the only animated Batman film to be given a theatrical release, as well as the only one to receive a full theatrical release until The Lego Batman Movie in 2017.

Plot

A young Bruce Wayne and Andrea Beaumont begin a relationship after meeting while visiting their respective parents' graves. During this time, Bruce makes his first attempts at crime-fighting. While he succeeds in foiling robberies, he is discouraged that the criminals do not fear him. Bruce becomes conflicted about whether to commit to his relationship with Andrea or defend Gotham City to avenge his parents, but eventually he proposes marriage. Andrea accepts, only to mysteriously leave Gotham with her father, businessman Carl Beaumont, ending the engagement in a Dear John letter. Heartbroken, Bruce assumes the mantle of Batman.

Ten years later, Batman breaks up a meeting of Gotham crime bosses led by Chuckie Sol. When Sol tries to escape in his car, a cloaked figure, the Phantasm, causes him to speed out of control and fatally crash into a building. Witnesses  see Batman at the scene, and it is believed that he killed Sol. A city councilman, Arthur Reeves, who is corrupt and on the mob's payroll, vows to have Batman arrested. 

The Phantasm murders another gangster, Buzz Bronski, in the Gotham Cemetery. Bronski's bodyguards see Phantasm and mistakenly believe it's Batman. Batman investigates the scene of Bronski's death and encounters Andrea, inadvertently revealing his identity to her. Batman finds evidence linking Carl Beaumont with Sol, Bronski, and a third gangster, Salvatore Valestra, later finding a photograph of the four together in Valestra's home. Paranoid that Batman will come for him next, the now-elderly Valestra asks Reeves for help, but he is refused. In desperation, he turns to the Joker.

The Phantasm goes to kill Valestra at his mansion, only to find him dead from exposure to Joker's venom. Seeing the Phantasm through a camera, Joker realizes Batman is not the murderer and detonates a bomb he planted in the mansion. The Phantasm escapes the blast and is pursued by Batman but disappears, leaving Batman ambushed by the police but saved from arrest by Andrea. She later explains to Bruce that her father embezzled money from Valestra and was forced to repay it; Valestra then demanded he pay more and put a hit on Carl, prompting him to go into hiding with Andrea. While Bruce considers resuming his relationship with Andrea, he concludes that Carl Beaumont is the Phantasm. However, Bruce takes another look at the photo of Carl and Valestra, and he recognizes one of Valestra's men as the Joker.

Joker presses Reeves for information, believing him to be behind the Phantasm in order to erase his mob connections, before poisoning him with venom which drives Reeves insane. Reeves is taken to the hospital, where he is interrogated by Batman, confessing that while previously working as Carl's accountant, he helped the Beaumonts escape, but he revealed  their location to Valestra in exchange for funding his first city council campaign. Both Batman and Joker deduce that the Phantasm is Andrea, who intends to wipe out the Valestra mob for killing her father and robbing her of a future with Bruce.

Andrea tracks down Joker, her father's killer, to his hideout in Gotham's abandoned World's Fair. They fight but are interrupted by Batman, who begs Andrea to stop, to no avail. Joker prepares to blow up the fair but is seized by Andrea, who bids Batman goodbye as the explosives detonate. Batman survives the blast but finds no trace of either Andrea or the Joker. 

Bruce is later consoled by Alfred in the Batcave, who assures him Andrea could not have been helped, before finding Andrea's locket containing a picture of them together. A sorrowful Andrea departs Gotham and a saddened Batman, cleared of the accusations against him, resumes crimefighting.

Voice cast
 Kevin Conroy as Bruce Wayne / Batman
 Mark Hamill as The Joker 
 Dana Delany as Andrea Beaumont / The Phantasm
 Stacy Keach (who also voices Carl Beaumont) provided the voice for The Phantasm while masked. 
 Hart Bochner as Arthur Reeves 
 Stacy Keach as Carl Beaumont 
 Abe Vigoda as Sal "The Wheezer" Valestra
 Dick Miller as Chuckie Sol
 John P. Ryan as Buzz Bronski
 Efrem Zimbalist Jr. as Alfred Pennyworth
 Bob Hastings as Commissioner James Gordon
 Robert Costanzo as Detective Harvey Bullock
 Jeff Bennett provides additional voices as First and Second Burglar, Biker, Cop in Helicopter, Cop on Radio, SWAT Team Member, and Passenger on Ship.
 Arleen Sorkin as Mrs. Bambi, one of Bruce's socialite flirts (uncredited)

Production
Impressed by the success of the first season of Batman: The Animated Series on Fox, Warner Bros. assigned Alan Burnett to write a story for a full-length animated film. The original idea for the film was to have Batman being captured by his enemies at Arkham Asylum and face a kangaroo court in which the villains try him for making them what they are. The idea's concept, however, was considered "too brainy", as it required Batman to be immobile for a long time, so the idea was later used in the series' episode "Trial", which was aired after the film's release. Although the Joker does play a pivotal role in the film, it was Burnett's intention to tell a story far removed from the television series' regular rogues gallery. Burnett also cited he "wanted to do a love story with Bruce because no one had really done it on the TV show. I wanted a story that got into his head." Members of the creative team have claimed that they did not intend for the Joker to appear in the film; Paul Dini has contradicted this, stating that the Joker's role was always part of the story from the beginning of the film's production. The writers were highly cautious of placing the Joker in the film, as they did not want any connection to Tim Burton's 1989 film Batman, but writer Michael Reaves said, "We then realized that we could make his appearance serve the story in a way that we never could in live-action." In order to keep the Joker as a solo threat, Bruce Timm and Burnett convinced frequent Animated Series writer Dini to not use Harley Quinn in the film for that reason. The same technique was previously used in the episodes "Joker's Wild" and "The Strange Secret of Bruce Wayne".

Aiding Burnett in writing the script were Martin Pasko, who handled most of the flashback segments; Reaves, who wrote the climax; and Dini, who claims he "filled in holes here and there". The film's plot was heavily influenced by the 1987 miniseries Batman: Year Two, written by Mike W. Barr and illustrated by Alan Davis, Paul Neary, Alfredo Alcala, Mark Farmer and Todd McFarlane. Orson Welles' 1941 classic Citizen Kane served as an influence for the flashbacks, a story about loss and the passage of time. According to Kevin Conroy, Andrea Beaumont was named after voice director Andrea Romano. The character of Hazel, the cook robot of the World of the Future Fair, was named by Burnett after Hazel the Maid (portrayed by Academy Award-winning actress Shirley Booth), The Saturday Evening Post protagonist of cartoonist Ted Key's TV series Hazel. On the other hand, the design of the Phantasm went into 20 different versions until one was found which convinced the film's crew. According to Burnett, the Phantasm was like the Grim Reaper with a cape, although the idea was to make him resemble the Ghost of Christmas Yet to Come of Charles Dickens' novel A Christmas Carol, something that even the Joker mentions in the finished version of the film.

Early in production, Warner Bros. decided to release Phantasm theatrically, rather than straight to video. That left less than a year for production time (most animated features take well over two years from finished story to final release). Due to this decision, the animators went over the scenes in order to accommodate the widescreen theatrical aspect ratio. The studio cooperated well, granting the filmmakers a large amount of creative control.

Warner Bros. also increased the production budget to $6 million, which gave the filmmakers opportunities for more elaborate set pieces. The opening title sequence featured a flight through an entirely computer-generated Gotham City. As a visual joke, sequence director Kevin Altieri set the climax of the film inside a miniature automated model of Gotham City, where Batman and the Joker are giants. This was an homage to a mainstay of Batman comic books of the Dick Sprang era, often featuring the hero fighting against a backdrop of gigantic props (they would later do another homage to Sprang's works in The New Batman Adventures episode "Legends of the Dark Knight"). From start to finish, the film was completed within eight months.

Themes
Paul Dini intended each of the flashbacks into Batman's love life to "have a tendency to get worse, when you hope things will get better." Bruce's relationship with Andrea, which at first shows promise, eventually turns into turmoil. At first, Bruce and Andrea are set for marriage, but then Bruce is given a farewell note from Andrea cutting off their relationship. This eventually leads into Bruce's decision to become Batman. Richard Corliss of Time felt this scene paralleled Andrea's decision to avenge her own parents and reject love when she finds her own father murdered. Both events transform the two people (Bruce becomes Batman, Andrea becomes the Phantasm). One scene depicts Bruce Wayne at his parents' tombstone saying, "I didn't count on being happy." According to Reaves, this scene was to be a pivotal moment in Bruce's tragic life, as he denies himself the opportunity to live a normal life. Reaves also stated: "When Bruce puts on the mask for the first time, [after Andrea breaks their engagement], and Alfred says 'My God!' he's reacting in horror, because he's watching this man he's helped raise from childhood, this man who has let the desire for vengeance and retribution consume his life, at last embrace the unspeakable."

Music

The soundtrack was composed by Shirley Walker, the main composer for The Animated Series. Walker cited the score as a favorite among her own compositions. In an interview with Cinemusic.com, Walker explained that the "latin" lyrics used in the Main Title were actually names of key Warner Bros. staff read backwards. The song "I Never Even Told You" was written by Siedah Garrett and Glen Ballard. It was performed by Tia Carrere. Hans Zimmer, who would later compose the score for The Dark Knight Trilogy, played the synthesizer on the score.

The score was originally released on December 14, 1993, by Reprise Records. On March 24, 2009, La-La Land Records released a limited expanded edition. The release includes all tracks found on the original release with some tracks expanded. It also features almost 30 minutes of previously unreleased material.

Marketing
In December 1993, two novelizations were released. One was a young readers book written by Andrew Helfer, with the other being an adult-oriented novelisation authored by Geary Gravel.

DC Comics released a comic book adaptation written by Kelley Puckett and drawn by Mike Parobeck. The comic book adaptation was later included with the VHS release. Kenner, who had already released toys for the cartoon series, produced several tie-in figures for the film, including Joker and the Phantasm (packaged unmasked, spoiling a pivotal plot point in the film). Batman & Robin Adventures Annual #1: Shadow of the Phantasm is a comic book sequel to the film. It was written by Dini and released in 1996. In 2015, a DC Collectibles action figure 2-pack featuring Batman and Phantasm was released.

Home media
Mask of the Phantasm was released on LaserDisc in April 1994 and on VHS in May of the same year. The VHS was reissued in April 2003 as part of a three-tape pack with Batman & Mr. Freeze: SubZero and Batman Beyond: Return of the Joker. Mask of the Phantasm was first released on DVD in December 1999 as a snap case and in October 2005 as a keep case with the insert. The film was re-released in April 2004 as a three disc DVD box set that included SubZero and Return of the Joker. That version is currently out of print. Warner Home Video re-released the film again in February 2008 as a double feature DVD with SubZero.

The film was released as part of the Warner Archive Collection on Blu-ray on July 25, 2017, featuring new high definition transfers in 16:9 and open matte 4:3 presentations. The film was also included in the Blu-ray release of the Batman: The Complete Animated Series box-set in late 2018.

Box office
Batman: Mask of the Phantasm opened on Christmas Day, 1993 in the United States in 1,506 theaters, accumulating $1,189,975 over its first 2 days. The film went on to gross $5,795,524 in the domestic total box office intake. The filmmakers blamed Warner Bros. for the unsuccessful marketing campaign, which is commonly attributed to the rushed production schedule due to studio's last-minute decision to release the film theatrically. Despite this, Mask of the Phantasm eventually turned a profit with its various home media releases.

Reception and legacy

Critical response

Batman: Mask of the Phantasm received generally positive reviews from critics. The site's critics consensus reads, "Stylish and admirably respectful of the source material, Batman: Mask of the Phantasm succeeds where many of the live-action Batman adaptations have failed." Empire cited it as the best animated film of 1993, and felt it contained better storylines than Tim Burton's Batman and Batman Returns. TV Guide Magazine was impressed with the Art Deco noir design that was presented. In addition the film's climax and Batman's escape from the Gotham City Police Department were considered to be elaborate action sequences. Richard Harrington of The Washington Post agreed with overall aspects that included the animation, design, dialogue and storyline, as well as Shirley Walker's film score. Gene Siskel and Roger Ebert regretted not having viewed the film during its theatrical release and gave it a positive review on their television series, At the Movies, when the film was released on home media, with Siskel feeling that Phantasm was better than Batman Returns and Joel Schumacher's Batman Forever, and only slightly below Batman.

However, Stephen Holden of The New York Times thought the voice performances were "flat and one-dimensional".  Chris Hicks of the Deseret News felt "the picture didn't come alive until the third act" feeling that the animators sacrificed the visuals for the storyline. In addition, he felt Mark Hamill's Joker "stole the show." Leonard Klady of Variety had mixed reactions towards the film, but his review was negative overall. He felt the overall themes and morals were clichéd and cited the animation to be to the "point of self-parody".

Wireds Scott Thill called Kevin Conroy "the finest Batman on record" in 2009. In a 2010 list, IGN ranked Mask of the Phantasm as the 25th best animated film of all time. That same year, IGN also stated it was "the Dark Knight's best big screen story" until Batman Begins. In 2011, Total Film also named Mask of the Phantasm as one of the greatest animated films of all time, coming in at 47th out of 50. Time ranked Phantasm as one of the 10 best superhero films ever in 2011. In 2017, Screen Rant named the film the best Batman movie of all time. In 2018, Paste magazine called the film "the greatest Batman movie". In 2022, Empire magazine named Mask of the Phantasm the best Batman movie. Also in 2022, nearly 30 years after its release, Rolling Stone placed Mask of the Phantasm at number 19 on its list of the 50 Greatest Superhero Movies of All Time, being the only traditionally-animated film included, the third-best animated superhero movie and the second-best Batman movie of all time, behind only The Dark Knight (number 8). 

Mask of the Phantasm was cited as an example of a film that effectively personified the character's "inner bubble" and psyche by actor Robert Pattinson, who portrayed a live-action iteration of Bruce Wayne in the Matt Reeves film The Batman (2022).

To commemorate the film's 20th anniversary, a screening of the film was held in Santa Monica with cast members Kevin Conroy, Dana Delany and Mark Hamill in attendance. To commemorate the film's 25th anniversary, Fathom Events rereleased the film for one day on November 12, 2018.

Accolades
Alongside The Lion King and The Nightmare Before Christmas, Mask of the Phantasm was nominated for an Annie Award in the category of Best Animated Feature, but lost to the former.

References

Further reading

External links

 
 
 
 
 
 Batman: Mask of the Phantasm at The World's Finest
 Interview with Writer Martin Pasko
Original theatrical trailer
Excerpt

1993 films
1993 action thriller films
1993 animated films
1993 crime thriller films
1990s American animated films
1990s animated superhero films
1990s English-language films
American children's animated action films
American children's animated superhero films
American children's animated science fiction films
American films about revenge
Animated Batman films
Animated films about revenge
Animated films based on animated series
DC Animated Universe films
Films based on television series
Films directed by Eric Radomski
Films directed by Bruce Timm
Films scored by Shirley Walker
Films with screenplays by Alan Burnett
Films with screenplays by Paul Dini
Warner Bros. films
Warner Bros. Animation animated films
Works based on Batman: The Animated Series
World's fairs in fiction